In Norse mythology, Árvakr (Old Norse: , "early awake") and Alsviðr ("very quick") are the horses which pull the sun, or Sól's chariot, across the sky each day. It is said that the gods fixed bellows underneath the two horses' shoulders to help cool them off as they rode.

Both horses are only mentioned in Gylfaginning and Grímnismál and their names are frequently associated with descriptions of the Sun. In Nordic mythology, gods govern the passage of days, nights, and seasons, and shape the Sun from a spark of the flame Muspelheim, but the Sun stands still without a driver. Sól is kidnapped by the gods to drive the Sun in a chariot pulled by two horses. Two large bellows (Isarnkoll; cold iron) were placed under the shoulders of the two horses to protect them from the immense heat of the Sun. Sól is unable to stop driving the chariot or else Sköll will catch the Sun and devour it; the Sun is expected to be caught and devoured on the day of Ragnarök.

The antiquity of the myth that the Sun is pulled by horses is not definitely from the Nordic religion. Many other mythologies and religions contain a solar deity or carriage of the Sun pulled by horses. In Persian and Phrygian mythology, Mithras and Attis perform this task. In Greek mythology, Apollo performs this task, although it was previously performed by Helios. The myth of Árvakr and Alsviðr is thought to have inspired English dramatist and poet James Shirley's play The Triumph of Peace (1663).

See also
Trundholm sun chariot
Ashvins
Alcis (gods)
List of fictional horses

References

Bibliography

 Simek, Rudolf (2007) translated by Angela Hall. Dictionary of Northern Mythology. D.S. Brewer. 

Horses in Norse mythology
Solar chariot